Calallen Independent School District is a school district located in northwest Corpus Christi, Texas (USA) in northern Nueces County.  The district has approximately 4,000 students and operates four elementary schools, a middle school, and a high school.

In 2009, the school district was rated "academically recognized" by the Texas Education Agency.

Background

The school district's name comes from Calvin Joseph (Cal) Allen (1859-1922), a prominent early rancher.  Allen owned a  cattle ranch on which the school district is now located.  Allen donated land to the St. Louis, Brownsville and Mexico Rail Line as right-of-way; in exchange, the railroad agreed to place a depot on Allen's property. Allen then subdivided the land adjacent to the depot and established a townsite there.  The town was named Calvin until it was discovered that another community in Texas already had that name.  Founded in 1910, Calallen was annexed by the city of Corpus Christi in 1970.

Schools

Secondary schools
 Calallen High School (Grades 9-12)
 Calallen Middle School (Grades 6-8)

Primary schools
 Wilma Magee Intermediate School (Grades 3-5) 
 East Primary School (Grades Pre-K-2)
 Wood River Primary School (Grades Pre-K-2)
 West Intermediate (Grades 3-5)

School uniforms
Students in primary , intermediate , and middle schools have to wear school uniforms .

Shirts must be white, blue, gray, or maroon polo shirts. CISD "spirit shirts" are also acceptable.

Bottoms may be navy, khaki, or blue denim. 
Students in Middle School (Grades 6-8) must wear ID badges around their neck.

References

External links
 

School districts in Nueces County, Texas